Kamal Singh Malik (कमल सिंह मलिक, Born: 1 February 1966) is an Indian politician and a member of the 17th Legislative Assembly of Uttar Pradesh of India. He represents the Garhmukteshwar constituency of Uttar Pradesh and is a member of the Bharatiya Janata Party political party.

Early life and education 
He was born in February 1966 in a Farmer Family of Lodhipur, a village in Moradabad district. From childhood he is the active Swayamsevak of Rashtriya Swayamsevak Sangh. He has completed his M.A. from M. J. P. Rohilkhand University First division (university Topper) and also awarded PhD in Geography.

References

People from Moradabad district
1966 births
Living people
Bharatiya Janata Party politicians from Uttar Pradesh
Uttar Pradesh MLAs 2017–2022